The People's Republic of China competed at the 2002 Winter Olympics in Salt Lake City, United States. The team excludes athletes from the Special Administrative Region of Hong Kong, which competed separately as Hong Kong, China. China won its first Winter Olympic gold medal at these Games. It had previously won silver and bronze medals at prior Games.

Medalists

Biathlon

Men

Women

Women's 4 × 7.5 km relay

 1 A penalty loop of 150 metres had to be skied per missed target. 
 2 Starting delay based on 10 km sprint results. 
 3 One minute added per missed target. 
 4 Starting delay based on 7.5 km sprint results.

Cross-country skiing

Men
Sprint

Pursuit

 1 Starting delay based on 10 km C. results. 
 C = Classical style, F = Freestyle

Women
Sprint

Pursuit

 2 Starting delay based on 5 km C. results. 
 C = Classical style, F = Freestyle

Figure skating

Men

Pairs

Ice Dancing

Freestyle skiing

Men

Women

Ice hockey

Women's tournament

Group stage - Group B
Top two teams (shaded) advanced to semifinals.

Classification round
5th place semifinal

7th place match

Short track speed skating

Men

Women

Speed skating

Men

Women

References

Official Olympic Reports
International Olympic Committee results database
 Olympic Winter Games 2002, full results by sports-reference.com

Nations at the 2002 Winter Olympics
2002
Winter Olympics